Karl Gaul (February 1, 1889 – January 17, 1972) was a German politician of the Free Democratic Party (FDP) and former member of the German Bundestag.

Life 
Gaul had been involved in politics since 1911 and joined the DDP in 1919. In 1945, he participated in the founding of the Liberal Democratic Party (LDP), which later became the Hessian state association of the FDP.
Member of Parliament
Gaul was a member of the Hessian state parliament from 1946 to 1950. He had been a member of the German Bundestag since its first election in 1949 until 1957, where he was chairman of the Bundestag committee for cultural policy.

Literature

References 

 
1889 births 
1972 deaths
Members of the Bundestag for Hesse
Members of the Bundestag 1953–1957
Members of the Bundestag 1949–1953
Members of the Bundestag for the Free Democratic Party (Germany)
Members of the Landtag of Hesse